NGC 6871 is a small, young open cluster in the constellation of Cygnus. The cluster has fewer than 50 members, most of which are blue and white stars. It is located 5135 light-years from Earth.

References

External links

NGC 6871 at WEBDA
NGC 6871 at Bernhard Hubl's Astrophotography
NGC 6871 at Astronomy Magazine

Open clusters
Cygnus (constellation)
6871